Mike Pedicin (born Michael L. Pedicine; October 24, 1917 – June 26, 2016) was an American saxophonist and jazz bandleader.

Pedicine was born in Philadelphia, Pennsylvania. He started playing the saxophone at age 9. By the age of 10, he was a regular on the local radio show The Horn & Hardart Children's Hour. He appeared on the show for eight years.
In the 1950s and 1960s, during the summer, Mike's band played at various night spots in Somers Point, NJ. Tony Marts & Bay Shores, the two most popular spots. His best-known record was "Shake a Hand" (Cameo Records, 1958), originally recorded by Faye Adams in 1953.

Pedicin, a resident of Ardmore, Pennsylvania, died of pneumonia in June 2016 at the age of 98.

References

1917 births
2016 deaths
American male saxophonists
American jazz bandleaders
Musicians from Philadelphia
RCA Victor artists
Deaths from pneumonia in Pennsylvania
Jazz musicians from Pennsylvania
American male jazz musicians
20th-century American saxophonists
American jazz saxophonists